The P.C. Mittal Memorial Bus Terminus is a bus terminal located on Sevoke Road, Siliguri, District Darjeeling. Both State owned North Bengal State Transport Corporation (NBSTC) buses and private buses ply from here. Some bus routes may be shifted to this terminal to reduce traffic congestion. The Terminus is named after P.C. Mittal, a social worker and a businessman, who was a resident of the Darjeeling District.

This bus terminus is maintained by Siliguri Municipal Corporation. In 2021, plans to refurbish the terminus were announced. The buses from this station connects Alipurduar district, Kalimpong District, Cooch Behar district and Jalpaiguri district of West Bengal.

Amenities 
 Parking
 Washroom
 Restroom
 Food stall
 Bookstore
 Newspaper seller
 Information center
 24×7 Transit
 Ola Cabs, Uber, Rapido

Bus routes 
Siliguri-Jaigaon
Siliguri-Malbazar
Siliguri-Cooch Bihar
Siliguri-Alipurduar
Siliguri-Phuentsholing
Siliguri-Gorubathan
 Siliguri-Birpara
 Siliguri-Sevoke-Odlabari
 Siliguri-Hasimara
 Siliguri-Binnaguri

See also
 Tenzing Norgay Bus Terminus (Siliguri)
 Sikkim Nationalised Transport Bus Terminus (Siliguri)

References

Bus stations in India
Buildings and structures in Darjeeling district
Transport in Siliguri